Zinc finger protein 207 is a protein in humans that is encoded by the ZNF207 gene.

References

Further reading 

Human proteins